Ali Al-Ghadi (born 10 October 1952) is a Yemeni former long-distance running athlete. He competed for North Yemen at the 1984 Summer Olympic Games in the men's 5000 metres (finishing eighth in his heat) and the men's 10,000 metres (where he failed to finish in his heat).

References

External links
 

1952 births
Living people
Yemeni male long-distance runners
Athletes (track and field) at the 1984 Summer Olympics
Olympic athletes of North Yemen
20th-century Yemeni people